"Wild Wood" is a song by British singer-songwriter Paul Weller, released in August 1993 as the second single from his second solo album, Wild Wood (1993). It peaked at number 14 on the UK Singles Charts and was certified silver by the British Phonographic Industry (BPI). A music video directed by Pedro Romhanyi was produced to promote the single. Portishead remixed the song for the 1999 re-release.

Critical reception
David Beran from the Gavin Report described the song as "a laid back acoustic sojourn with a Neil Young feel". He added, "Weller's songwriting talents are hard to deny". Caroline Sullivan from The Guardian wrote in her album review, "The searching, almost spiritual title tune wafted along by barely-there bass and acoustic guitar, is nothing less than delectable". Another editor, Alexis Petridis, ranked "Wild Wood" number four in his list of "Paul Weller's 30 Greatest Songs -- ranked!". He wrote, "You could trace the roots of Weller's folky bent back to the Jam's "English Rose" and "Liza Radley", but "Wild Wood" remains its finest flowering. The gorgeously understated music suggests getting it together in the country, but — as on Weller favourite Nick Drake's Bryter Layter — the lyrical setting is distinctly urban. Killer Portishead remix too." 

A reviewer from Music Week felt the song is "arguably the highlight" of his 1998 album, Modern Classics, declaring it as an "acoustic belter". Parry Gettelman from Orlando Sentinel wrote, "The haunting "Wild Wood" combines a sort of jazz-folk acoustic guitar style with bluesy organ and arty Mellotron while Weller's vocal has a country-soul-gospel feel. Weller's lyrics aren't as complex as his music, but his voice can make a line as ordinary as "Now you're gone, I feel so alone" resonate." Uncut ranked it as Weller's ninth best ever song and the best of his solo career, with the Smiths' bassist Andy Rourke praising it as a "very easy, kicking-back sort of song".

Track listings
 7-inch single, UK (1993)
 "Wild Wood"
 "Ends of the Earth"

 CD single, Europe (1993)
 "Wild Wood" – 3:22
 "Ends of the Earth" – 2:27

Charts

References

1993 singles
1993 songs
Go! Discs singles
Music videos directed by Pedro Romhanyi
Song recordings produced by Brendan Lynch (music producer)
Songs written by Paul Weller